Henri Fantin-Latour (14 January 1836 – 25 August 1904) was a French painter and lithographer best known for his flower paintings and group portraits of Parisian artists and writers.

Biography
He was born Ignace Henri Jean Théodore Fantin-Latour in Grenoble, Isère. As a youth, he received drawing lessons from his father, who was an artist. In 1850 he entered the Ecole de Dessin, where he studied with Lecoq de Boisbaudran. After studying at the École des Beaux-Arts in Paris from 1854, he devoted much time to copying the works of the old masters in the Musée du Louvre. Although Fantin-Latour befriended several of the young artists who would later be associated with Impressionism, including Whistler and Manet, Fantin's own work remained conservative in style.

Whistler brought attention to Fantin in England, where his still-lifes sold so well that they were "practically unknown in France during his lifetime". In addition to 
his realistic paintings, Fantin-Latour created imaginative lithographs inspired by the music of some of the great classical composers. In 1876, Fantin-Latour attended a performance of the Ring cycle at Bayreuth, which he found particularly moving. He would later publish lithographs inspired by Richard Wagner in La revue wagnérienne, which helped solidify his reputation among Paris' avant-garde as an anti-naturalist painter.

In 1875, Henri Fantin-Latour married a fellow painter, Victoria Dubourg, after which he spent his summers on the country estate of his wife's family at Buré, Orne in Lower Normandy, where he died on 25 August 1904.

He was interred in the Cimetière du Montparnasse, Paris, France.

Legacy
Marcel Proust mentions Fantin-Latour's work in In Search of Lost Time:
"Many young women's hands would be incapable of doing what I see there," said the Prince, pointing to Mme de Villeparisis's unfinished watercolours. And he asked her whether she had seen the flower painting by Fantin-Latour which had recently been exhibited. (The Guermantes Way)

His first major UK gallery exhibition in 40 years took place at the Bowes Museum in April 2011. Musée du Luxembourg presented a retrospective exhibition of his work in 2016–2017 entitled "À fleur de peau".

The painting A Basket of Roses was used as the cover of New Order's album Power, Corruption & Lies by Peter Saville in 1983.

Gallery

Public collections holding works by Fantin-Latour

Aberdeen Art Gallery (Scotland)
Armand Hammer Museum of Art (California)
Art Gallery of New South Wales (Sydney, Australia)
Art Gallery of the University of Rochester (New York)
Art Institute of Chicago
Arthur Ross Gallery (University of Pennsylvania)
Ashmolean Museum (University of Oxford)
Birmingham Museums & Art Gallery (UK)
Bristol Museum & Art Gallery (UK)
Bowes Museum (County Durham, England)
British Museum
Carnegie Museum of Art (Pittsburgh, Pennsylvania)
Clark Art Institute (Williamstown, Massachusetts)
Cleveland Museum of Art
Dallas Museum of Art
Detroit Institute of Arts
Dixon Gallery and Gardens (Tennessee)
Fine Arts Museums of San Francisco
Fitzwilliam Museum (University of Cambridge)
Fondation Bemberg Museum (Toulouse, France)
Foundation E.G. Bührle (Zürich)
Hammer Museum
Harvard University Art Museums
Hermitage Museum
Honolulu Museum of Art
Indiana University Art Museum
J. Paul Getty Museum
Kröller-Müller Museum (Otterlo, Netherlands)
Lady Lever Art Gallery (UK)
La Piscine (Roubaix, France)
Los Angeles County Museum of Art
MacKenzie Art Gallery (Regina, Saskatchewan)
Manchester City Art Gallery (UK)
Metropolitan Museum of Art
Montreal Museum of Fine Arts, (Canada)
Museum of Grenoble (France)
Museum of Modern Art
Musée de Picardie (Amiens, France)
Musée des Beaux-Arts de Bordeaux (France)
Musée des Beaux-Arts de Lyon (France)
 (Pau, France)
Musée des Beaux-Arts (Reims, France)
Museum Geelvinck (Amsterdam, Netherlands)
Musée des Beaux-Arts de Rouen (France)
Musée d'Orsay (Paris)
Musée du Louvre (Paris)
 (Mâcon, France)
Museo Nacional de Bellas Artes (Buenos Aires, Argentina)
Museu Calouste Gulbenkian (Lisbon)
Museum of Fine Arts, Boston
National Gallery of Art (Washington D.C.)
National Gallery of Canada
National Gallery, London
National Museum Cardiff
National Museum Wales
Nelson-Atkins Museum of Art (Kansas City, Missouri)
Norton Simon Museum (Pasadena, California)
Old Jail Art Center (Albany, Texas)
Philadelphia Museum of Art
Rijksmuseum (Amsterdam)
Saint Louis Art Museum
San Diego Museum of Art
Smart Museum of Art (University of Chicago)
Tate Gallery (London)
Thyssen-Bornemisza Museum
Toledo Museum of Art (Ohio)
Université de Liège Collections (Belgium)
University of Michigan Museum of Art (Ann Arbor)
Van Gogh Museum
Victoria and Albert Museum
Virginia Museum of Fine Arts
Wadsworth Atheneum (Hartford)
Winnipeg Art Gallery

Notes

References
 
 Gibson, Frank F., The art of Henri Fantin-Latour, his life and work, London, Drane's ltd., 1924.
 Lucie-Smith, Edward, Henri Fantin-Latour, New York, Rizzoli, 1977.
 Poulet, Anne L., & Murphy, A. R., Corot to Braque: French Paintings from the Museum of Fine Arts, Boston, Boston: The Museum, 1979. 
 Rosenblum, Robert, Paintings in the Musée d'Orsay, New York: Stewart, Tabori & Chang, 1989.

External links

Henri-Fantin-Latour.org 273 works by Henri Fantin-Latour
Henri Fantin-Latour, Still Life, 1867, watercolor, Bryn Mawr College Art and Artifact Collections

1836 births
1904 deaths
Artists from Grenoble
19th-century French painters
French male painters
20th-century French painters
20th-century French male artists
Symbolist painters
French Symbolist painters
Flower artists
French still life painters
Burials at Montparnasse Cemetery
20th-century French printmakers
19th-century French male artists